Trechus gallorites is a species of ground beetle in the subfamily Trechinae. It was described by Jeannel in 1936.

References

gallorites
Beetles described in 1936